Edward Blunt may refer to:

 E. A. H. Blunt (1877–1941), British civil servant
Edward Blunt (publisher) (1562–1632), English publisher

See also
Edwin Blunt (1918–1993), English footballer
Edmund Blunt (1770–1862), American navigator
Edward Blount (disambiguation), pronounced Blunt
Ted Blunt (born 1943), American elected official, educator and former athlete